The Telegraph, frequently called The Macon Telegraph, is the primary print news organ in Middle Georgia. It is the third-largest newspaper in the State of Georgia (after the Atlanta Journal-Constitution and Augusta Chronicle). Founded in 1826, The Telegraph has undergone several name changes, mergers, and publishers. As of June 2006, the paper is owned by The McClatchy Company, a publicly traded American publishing company.

The Telegraph's Name Changes

History

Origins: 1826-1860

Dr. Myron Barlett (1798-1848) founded The Macon Telegraph and published its first edition on Wednesday, November 1, 1826, three years after the Georgia General Assembly chartered the city of Macon. In his "prospectus" on the front page of that Nov. 1 edition, Bartlett said in part that the Telegraph would "not only disseminate useful information but advocate fearlessly "THE RIGHTS OF THE PEOPLE!" The newspaper ran weekly at first (Bartlett didn’t begin publishing a daily until 1831). All the type was set by hand and it was a full-sheet affair. The columns were mostly short items copied from other newspapers.

By 1827, The Macon Telegraph was one out of 16 newspapers in Georgia, two of which ran in Macon, two in Savannah, four in Milledgeville, three in Augusta, one in Athens, one in Washington, one in Darien, and one in Mount Zion. The first daily Macon Telegraph, called Daily Macon Telegraph was printed Oct. 17, 1831. It lasted a little more than a year before transforming into a semi-weekly that was re-named Georgia Telegraph.

The first cartoon in The Telegraph appeared in the Sept. 22, 1840 edition.

On Nov. 17, 1846, the Macon Telegraph announced that "all market quotations were being received by Magnetic Telegraph." A century later, the newspaper carried the following comment about The Telegraph "The magnetism of this new and time-saving invention had created a great deal of excitement and people everywhere were conjecturing as to what would be the benefits and final unbelievable accomplishments of Morse's find."

American Civil War: 1861-1865
Macon Telegraph continued to print during the American Civil War, shrinking down to a single sheet in April 1863 until the end of the war due to a paper shortage.

On Sept. 19, 1864, Clisby sold The Telegraph to Henry L. Flash, who consolidated The Daily Confederate (a newspaper founded in Macon in 1863) with The Telegraph. The new name of the paper was Macon Daily Telegraph and Confederate.

On April 20, 1865, The Telegraph was temporarily suspended on account of the occupation of the city by the Federals. The editor fled his establishment and left it in charge of the printers, who did not attempt to bring out the regular editions, but two or three numbers of a small sheet called "The Daily News." The Augusta Chronicle and Sentinel had heard of Macon's occupation and, in the absence of the editors of 'The Telegraph and Confederate,' they took possession of the office and are issued a paper called The Daily News.

The Telegraph was resumed May 11 under the new ownership of Clayton and Dumble. The subscription rate fell from $120 a year to $12, even though the sheet was gotten out under the great difficulties. The Confederate ink and paper was used and it was practically impossible to issue a typographically neat page. On May 28, The Telegraph appeared in full four-sheet form and announced it would continue doing so until the resumption of mail service, when the full paper would be issued daily instead of Sundays only.

Pre-Anderson Era: 1866-1900
In 1866, Clayton and Dumble sold the newspaper to William A. Reid. In 1869, The Journal and Messenger was amalgamated with The Telegraph under the name Telegraph and Messenger. It was the fifth paper The Telegraph absorbed since it was founded. Other papers include The Courier, Citizen, Republic and Confederate.

In 1873, the name of the paper was changed to the Daily Telegraph and Messenger. The word "messenger" was dropped from its name in 1885.

The Anderson Era: 1900s
By 1900, there were 24 daily newspapers in Georgia, six semi-weeklies, one bi-weekly , 29 monthlies and 274 weeklies.

In 1914, the Anderson brothers, William T. and Peyton T., purchased the paper. P.T. Anderson had started working in the circulation department in 1909. Under their leadership, the paper inaugurated a special page focusing on the black community. They also purchased The Macon News and combined some staff positions between the two papers. The News continued to publish in the afternoon, while The Telegraph remained the morning paper.

W.T. Anderson published and edited The Macon Telegraph until 1940. In 1946, P.T. Anderson's son, Peyton, took over the papers. He became known for giving his editors great freedom to report the facts, as well as being a "pillar of the community". He sold The Telegraph and News in 1969 to Knight Newspapers, and retired to oversee his investments. Following his death in 1988, the bulk of his fortune, approximately $35 million, was left in his will to start one of Macon's major charitable foundations, The Peyton Anderson Foundation.

Corporate ownership
The new ownership merged with Ridder Publications in 1974 to create Knight Ridder. At the same time, the Saturday editions of The Telegraph and News merged.

A new The Macon Telegraph and News was published as a morning paper seven days a week.  During this era, Randall Savage and Jackie Crosby earned the paper its lone Pulitzer Prize to date in 1985 for an investigation into academic and athletics at the University of Georgia and the Georgia Institute of Technology.

The paper changed its name back to The Macon Telegraph in 1990, bringing over a century of The Macon News to an end.

Age of the internet, 2000s

In 2005, the name "Macon" was also dropped from the masthead, and the name of the newspaper became The Telegraph. The following year, Knight Ridder was sold to the McClatchy Company, bringing the newspaper under a new owner once again.

Products

Print Newspaper

The newspaper is printed in broadsheet format. The Telegraph prices are: daily, $1.50 & Sunday, $3. Price includes sales tax at newsracks; may be higher outside Bibb & adjacent counties. The newspaper is cheaper for subscribers.

Website

The Telegraph's digital traffic saw an average of over five million page views in 2018. Digital-only subscriptions are available to readers for $15.99 per month. Educational subscriptions are available to students and educators at a discounted rate.

External links
Macon.com: The Telegraph official site
Official mobile site
The McClatchy Company's subsidiary profile of The Telegraph
Macon Telegraph Archive Digital Library of Georgia

See also

 List of newspapers in Georgia (U.S. state)

Citations

Bibliography

 
 
 
 
 
 
 
 
 
 
 

Newspapers published in Georgia (U.S. state)
McClatchy publications
Knight Ridder
Mass media in Macon, Georgia
Newspapers established in 1826
1826 establishments in Georgia (U.S. state)